The Roche Perfia (2,499 m) is a mountain in the Aravis Range in Haute-Savoie, France.

Mountains of the Alps
Mountains of Haute-Savoie